Marion Delorme is a 1918 French silent historical drama film directed by Henry Krauss and starring Pierre Renoir, Nelly Cormon and Jean Worms. It is an adaptation of Victor Hugo's play Marion de Lorme, itself inspired by the life of the courtesan Marion Delorme. Albert Capellani had directed an earlier short film version of the play in 1912.

Main cast
 Pierre Renoir as Le roi Louis XIII
 Nelly Cormon as La courtisane Marion Delorme
 Jean Worms as Didier
 Armand Tallier as Gaspard de Saverny
 Pierre Alcover as Laffemas

References

Bibliography 
 Goble, Alan. The Complete Index to Literary Sources in Film. Walter de Gruyter, 1999.

External links 
 

1918 films
French silent films
1910s French-language films
Films based on works by Victor Hugo
Films directed by Henry Krauss
French black-and-white films
French historical drama films
1910s historical drama films
Pathé films
Silent historical drama films
1910s French films